The Mikhail Mishustin Cabinet is the federal government of Russia, formed in 2020, led by Prime Minister Mikhail Mishustin. It succeeded the previous one led by Dmitry Medvedev.

The Cabinet was formed between 16 and 21 January 2020 and is the last one following the constitutional reform of 2020 which has significantly changed the order of government formation.

On 30 April 2020 Mishustin tested positive for COVID-19. Mishustin confirmed his test results in a video conference with President Vladimir Putin, and nominated his deputy to take over for him as acting Prime Minister. Putin signed a decree appointing Andrey Belousov to the role on an acting basis, following Mishustin's recommendation. In May, three more ministers also tested positive for coronavirus and were temporarily replaced by their deputies.

Formation

The government began to form after the resignation of Dmitry Medvedev's cabinet on 15 January 2020. Medvedev resigned after President Vladimir Putin, during his Address to the Federal Assembly, proposed amendments to the Constitution that would change the balance of power. On the same day, Putin offered Mishustin the post of Prime Minister. After Mishustin's consent, Putin nominated him for approval to the State Duma. According to Putin, he was offered four candidates, but Mishustin was not among them. As a result, Putin independently decided to nominate Mishustin for the Prime Minister.

On 16 January 2020, after a meeting with Mishustin, United Russia decided to support him. Since United Russia has more than half of the seats in the State Duma, this means that Mishustin would become Prime Minister, even if all other parties voted against it. The Liberal Democratic Party and A Just Russia also expressed support for Mishustin.

The Communist Party, after meeting with Mishustin, said that it would abstain from voting. Gennady Zyuganov explained this by saying that the composition and program of the new Cabinet is unknown. However, since President Putin fulfilled the requirements of the Communist party, namely, dismissed the Medvedev government and proposed to expand the powers of the Parliament, the Communist party will not vote against the appointment of Mishustin.

State Duma confirmation

On 16 January, Mikhail Mishustin was confirmed by the State Duma as Prime Minister. This was the first time ever that a PM was confirmed without any votes against.

Structure and composition
During a meeting with the Communist Party, Mishustin announced drastic changes in the structure and personal composition of the government.

Mikhail Mishustin, during the formation of the cabinet, held consultations with parliamentary parties. According to State Duma Speaker Vyacheslav Volodin, from members of the previous cabinet, all factions expressed support for the power and international blocs, three Deputy Prime Ministers: Tatyana Golikova, Dmitry Kozak and Alexey Gordeyev, as well as Agriculture Minister Dmitry Patrushev.

According to Volodin, the MPs spoke critically about four Ministers from previous cabinet: the Education Minister Olga Vasilieva, the Culture Minister Vladimir Medinsky, the Health Minister Veronika Skvortsova and the Labour and Social Affairs Minister Maxim Topilin. The Liberal Democratic Party also criticized Yury Trutnev, the Deputy Prime Minister and Presidential Envoy to the Far Eastern Federal District. However, other MPs on the contrary spoke positively about Trutnev.

On 21 January, Mikhail Mishustin presented to President Vladimir Putin a draft structure of the Cabinet. On the same day, the President signed a decree on the structure of the Cabinet and appointed the proposed Ministers. According to the decree, the Prime Minister will have 9 deputies, and the Ministry for North Caucasus Affairs will be abolished.

On 28 January 2020, Mikhail Mishustin approved the distribution of responsibilities among Deputy Prime Ministers.

On 26 March 2020, Mishustin proposed to restore the Government's Presidium, a body in the structure of the Cabinet formed to solve operational issues. Previously, such a body existed in the first Government of Medvedev, but in the second Government of Medvedev there was no Presidium. On 29 March, the Presidium was formed.

Subsequent changes

Reshuffle due to COVID-19

Reshuffle in the Cabinet caused by the detection of disease in government members. It is assumed that all changes temporary and infected members of the government will return to the exercise of their powers after recovery.

On 30 April 2020, Prime Minister Mikhail Mishustin tested positive for COVID-19 and was hospitalised, Andrey Belousov was appointed the Acting Prime Minister. On 19 May, Mishustin returned to the exercise of his powers.
On 1 May 2020, Construction Minister Vladimir Yakushev tested positive for COVID-19 and was hospitalised, Nikita Stasishin was appointed the Acting Minister. On 26 May Yakushev recovered and returned to the exercise of his powers.
On 6 May 2020, Culture Minister Olga Lyubimova tested positive for COVID-19, Sergey Obryvalin was appointed the Acting Minister. Since the disease was mild, on 14 May Lyubimova recovered and returned to the exercise of her powers.

November 2020 reshuffle
In November 2020, there was a reshuffle in the government. In particular, three Ministers left the government, and two others changed their portfolios. In addition, a new position of Deputy Prime Minister was created. Since the reshuffle took place after the adoption of amendments to the Constitution and the new law on government, all appointments must be approved by the State Duma.

Yevgeny Dietrich, Minister of Transport, left government. Vitaly Savelyev has been nominated as a new Minister. He was approved on 10 November with 274 votes in favor.
Dmitry Kobylkin, Minister of Natural Resources and Ecology, left government. Alexander Kozlov has been nominated as a new Minister. He was approved on 10 November with 273 votes in favor.
Alexander Kozlov, Minister for Development of the Russian Far East and Arctic, nominated as new Minister of Natural Resources and Ecology. Aleksey Chekunkov has been nominated as a new Minister. He was approved on 10 November with 324 votes in favor.
Vladimir Yakushev, Minister for Construction and Housing, left government. Irek Faizullin has been nominated as a new Minister. He was approved on 10 November with 328 votes in favor.
Alexander Novak, Minister of Energy, nominated as new Deputy Prime Minister. Nikolay Shulginov has been nominated as a new Minister. He was approved on 10 November with 329 votes in favor.
Alexander Novak approved as new Deputy Prime Minister on 10 November with 327 votes in favor.

Yevgeny Zinichev death
On 8 September 2021, the Minister of Emergency Situations Yevgeny Zinichev died. His first deputy Aleksandr Chupriyan became the acting minister. Since the Minister of Emergency Situations is one of the five presidential ministers, a new minister should be appointed by the President of Russia after consultations with the Federation Council.

On 23 May 2022, President Vladimir Putin nominated Alexander Kurenkov for the post of new minister. On 25 May 2022, the Federation Council approved Kurenkov's candidacy with 159 votes in favor, and on the same day he was appointed minister by presidential decree.

July 2022 reshuffle
On 12 July 2022, President Vladimir Putin by his decree introduced a new post of Deputy Prime Minister and combining it with the post of Minister of Industry and Trade. On the same day, Mikhail Mishustin nominated Denis Manturov, the current Minister of Industry and Trade, for the post of Deputy Prime Minister.

Denis Manturov was approved by the State Duma on 15 July with 394 votes in favor. On the same day, he was appointed to the post of Deputy Prime Minister by presidential decree. In addition, Yury Borisov, the Deputy Prime Minister  who previously supervised the defense industry complex, left the government and one position of Deputy PM was abolished.

Composition

Approval ratings

References

External links

Mishustin
Mishustin
2020 establishments in Russia
Current governments
2020s in Russian politics